The Alaska Engineering Commission Cottage No. 23, also known as DeLong Cottage, is an historic house at 618 Christensen Drive in Anchorage, Alaska.  It is a -story wood-frame structure, with a gable roof and porch extending across its front.  It was designed and built in 1916 by the Alaska Engineering Commission (A.E.C.), the federal government project to build the Alaska Railroad.  Of the surviving cottages built by the commission, it is the least-altered and best-preserved.

The cottage was listed on the National Register of Historic Places in 1990 as A. E. C. Cottage No. 23. It has also been known as DeLong Cottage.

See also
Alaska Engineering Commission Cottage No. 25
National Register of Historic Places listings in Anchorage, Alaska

References

Houses on the National Register of Historic Places in Alaska
Houses completed in 1916
1916 establishments in Alaska
Bungalow architecture in Alaska
Houses in Anchorage, Alaska
Buildings and structures on the National Register of Historic Places in Anchorage, Alaska